Ekaterina Andreeva may refer to:

 Ekaterina Andreeva (arachnologist)
 Ekaterina Andreeva (journalist)
 Ekaterina Andreeva (swimmer)